Franz Wittmann (born October 27, 1983) is an Austrian rally driver. He is a regular competitor in the Intercontinental Rally Challenge, driving a Peugeot 207 S2000, for Interwetten Racing. Wittmann's father, also called Franz, was also a rally driver, who won the 1987 Rally New Zealand, a round of the World Rally Championship.

External links
Official website 

1983 births
Austrian rally drivers
Living people